Shockadoom is a 2002 EP by American hip hop group Freestyle Fellowship.

Production
After releasing Innercity Griots in 1993, Freestyle Fellowship went on hiatus due to the incarceration of Self Jupiter. In 1998, the group reunited and recorded Shockadoom, which was mostly produced by Omid. It was released in 2002, a year after the release of Temptations.

Critical reception

Robert Gabriel of AllMusic gave Shockadoom 3 stars out of 5, saying, "Mikah 9, Aceyalone, P.E.A.C.E., and Self Jupiter each present themselves at the top of their game throughout Shockadoom, with vocal styles that make it a point to capture both the present and the future by reviving past African-American musical traditions." Sam Chennault of Pitchfork gave the EP an 8.4 out of 10, commenting that "it makes one wonder what would have been possible if Freestyle Fellowship could've stayed together long enough to record a full length in '98, and not waited until 2001 when the synergy between the four emcees had diminished."

Track listing

Personnel
Technical personnel

References

External links
 

2002 EPs
Freestyle Fellowship albums